Kranosaura is an extinct genus of archosauriform reptile from the Late Triassic Upper Maleri Formation of India. It contains a single species, K. kuttyi, described in 2021 by Sterling Nesbitt et al. It had an unusually domed head reminiscent of the later pachycephalosaurian dinosaurs in an example of convergent evolution, similar to that of Triopticus. Kranosaura was the sister taxon to Triopticus, with which it forms the clade Protopyknosia.

References 

Prehistoric archosauriforms
Prehistoric reptile genera
Norian genera
Late Triassic reptiles of Asia
Triassic India
Fossils of India
Fossil taxa described in 2021
Taxa named by Sankar Chatterjee
Taxa named by Jack Horner
Taxa named by Sterling Nesbitt
Taxa named by Michelle R. Stocker